Just the Way You Like It may refer to:

 Just the Way You Like It (The S.O.S. Band album), 1984
 Just the Way You Like It (Tasha Holiday album), 1997
 "Just the Way You Like It" (song), title track from the album